The 1918–19 season  was Madrid Football Club's 17th season in existence. The club played some friendly matches. They also played in the Campeonato Regional Centro (Central Regional Championship).

Friendlies

Competitions

Overview

Campeonato Regional Centro

League table

Matches

Notes

References

External links
Realmadrid.com Official Site
1918–19 Squad
1918–19 matches
1918–19 (Campeonato de Madrid)
International Friendlies of Real Madrid CF – Overview

Real Madrid CF
Real Madrid CF seasons